Beesby may refer to:
Beesby, North East Lincolnshire, a deserted medieval village in Lincolnshire, England
Beesby, East Lindsey, Lincolnshire, England
Gilbert Beesby, MP for Lincoln